The National Order of Chad is the preeminent order of merit of the Republic of Chad. It is also featured on the Coat of arms of Chad. The Grand Master of the order is the President of Chad.

Recipients
 Paul Biya
 Levi Eshkol
 Mordechai Namir
 Bernard Rogel
 Michel Sidibé

References

Orders, decorations, and medals of Chad
Awards established in 1960
1960 establishments in Chad